Aarne Ahi (born 11 September 1943, Tartu) is an Estonian animator and animated film director.

Since 1967 he worked at Tallinnfilm's department of puppetry, later he worked at Nukufilm.

Selected filmography
Filmography per IMDB:
 1975 "Lapsehoidjad"
 1978 "Linalakk ja Rosalin"
 1980 "Karsumm"
 1985 "Vägev vähk ja ahne naine"
 1987 "Magus planeet"
 1988 "Linnupüüdja"
 1991 "Kingikratt"
 1991 "The House Spirit"

References

Living people
1943 births
Estonian animators
Estonian film directors
People from Tartu